The following rivers have the name Clyde River:

Australia 
Clyde River (New South Wales), a river on the south coast of New South Wales
Clyde River (Tasmania), a river in central Tasmania
Clyde River (Northern Territory), a river in the Northern Territory

Canada 
Clyde River (Alberta)
Clyde River (Baffin Island), a river in Baffin Island
Clyde River, Nunavut, a settlement in northern Canada
Clyde River (Ontario), a river in eastern Ontario
Clyde River (Nova Scotia)

New Zealand 
Clyde River, New Zealand, a river of New Zealand

Scotland 
River Clyde, a major river in Scotland

North America 
Clyde River (New York), a tributary of the Seneca River
Clyde River (Vermont), a tributary of Lake Memphremagog

In addition, there are also communities with the name:
Clyde River, Nova Scotia, Canada
Clyde River, Nunavut, a settlement and a river in Baffin Island
Clyde River, Prince Edward Island, Canada